The Beaver Creek Indian Tribe or Beaver Creek Indians is a state-recognized tribe and nonprofit organization headquartered in Salley, South Carolina. The organization was awarded the status of a state-recognized tribe by the South Carolina Commission of Minority Affairs on January 27, 2006.  They are not a federally recognized Native American tribe and are one several recognized nonprofit organizations within South Carolina that allege to be descended from the historic Pee Dee. The organization is not to be confused with the Pee Dee Indian Nation of Beaver Creek, a "state-recognized group" recognized by the South Carolina Commission of Minority Affairs in 2007.

The tribe claims descent from a band of Pee Dee who settled between the forks of Edisto River in Orangeburg County, South Carolina during the eighteenth century.

Government
On January 28, 1998, the organization was first chartered as a nonprofit organization, being originally called the Beaver Creek Band of Pee Dee Indians. The tribe is governed by a chief, vice chief, and tribal council. Every two years the organization holds an election for these positions, each lasting for a term of four years, with the chief in one category and the vice-chief and tribal council in another.  Additionally, an elders council provides the tribal council with consultation and advice.  While the tribe traditionally inhabited lands near Neeses, South Carolina, the organization today is headquartered in Salley. 

In 1999, the Pee Dee Indian Nation of Beaver Creek split from the government of the tribe following an administrative disagreement and was later recognized by the South Carolina Commission for Minority Affairs as an independent state-recognized tribal group in 2007.

History

Dating from the American Revolutionary War through to the late twentieth century numerous sources and official government forms documented the ancestors of the Beaver Creek people as being Indian. This greatly assisted the tribe in achieving state recognition in the early 21st century. This provided proof that their people had a continuity of cultural and ethnic identity after the American Revolutionary War and throughout the coming years. The organization was awarded the status of a state-recognized tribe by the South Carolina Commission of Minority Affairs on January 27, 2006.

In the mid nineteenth century, their people filed a petition with the state of South Carolina on the behalf of Indian families residing near Edgefield County, South Carolina. The petition was in regards to the poll tax. More specifically, it inquired as to whether "persons of Indian descent are considered to be free persons of color". During this era, the ancestors of the Beaver Creek were recorded as "mulatto". Additionally, several early 20th century birth and death certificates designate their people's race as "Croatan". This term was often used to denote a person of mixed Indian ethnicity. Many of their people were also recorded as "Indian" on World War I civil enlistments.

Within an article written by Brewton Berry in 1948 entitled "The Mestizos of South Carolina", the author refers to the ancestors of the modern Beaver Creek Indian Tribe as tri-racial "outcasts" that did "not fit into the biracial caste system" then prevalent in South Carolina. Berry notes that sometimes individuals within Orangeburg County were commonly called racial slurs by local whites but that he preferred to use the term mestizo for academic purposes when referencing similar people throughout the state. 

By the late 1990s, more than one hundred future members of the Beaver Creek Indian Tribe, then led by J. Barry Chavis, began to meet in Neeses to plan to petition the government for proper recognition as the Beaver Creek Band of Pee Dee Indians. Members had previously been referred by racial slurs like redbone or brass ankle and were sometimes mistakenly considered Cherokee or Lumbee.  Prior to this time tribal members were often instructed to conceal their heritage by elders, who heavily suffered from discrimination during the early 20th century. Four Pines School for Indians was founded near Rocky Swamp sometime during the early twentieth century. Beaver Creek Indians and Pee Dee Indians attended the school as children up until the 1960s when South Carolina public schools were desegregated. During documented interviews that took place around the start of the 21st century many elders shared that while growing up their families always felt the need to be as secretive as possible about being Indians. They went on to state that they were forbidden to speak publicly about being Indians.

See also
Pedee people
Brass Ankles

References

Native American tribes in South Carolina
State-recognized tribes in the United States